
Gmina Stoszowice is a rural gmina (administrative district) in Ząbkowice Śląskie County, Lower Silesian Voivodeship, in south-western Poland.

Neighbouring gminas
Gmina Stoszowice is bordered by the town of Piława Górna and the gminas of Bardo, Dzierżoniów, Kłodzko, Nowa Ruda and Ząbkowice Śląskie.

Villages
The gmina contains the villages of Budzów, Budzów-Kolonia, Grodziszcze, Grodziszcze-Kolonia, Jemna, Lutomierz, Lutomierz-Kolonia, Mikołajów, Przedborowa, Różana, Rudnica, Srebrna Góra, Stoszowice, Stoszowice-Kolonia and Żdanów.

References

Stoszowice
Ząbkowice Śląskie County